is a railway station located in the eastern part of Itō, Shizuoka Prefecture, Japan operated by the private railroad company Izukyū Corporation.

Lines
Kawana Station is served by the Izu Kyūkō Line, and is located 6.1 kilometers from the starting point of the line at Itō Station and 23.0 kilometers from Atami Station.

Station layout
The station has two opposed ground-level side platforms connected by a level crossing. The station is staffed.

Platforms

Adjacent stations

History 
Kawana Station was opened on December 10, 1961. The station building was rebuilt in 1980.

Passenger statistics
In fiscal 2017, the station was used by an average of 767 passengers daily (boarding passengers only).

Surrounding area
 Kawana Onsen
Japan National Route 135

See also
 List of Railway Stations in Japan

References

External links

 Official home page

Railway stations in Japan opened in 1961
Railway stations in Shizuoka Prefecture
Izu Kyūkō Line
Itō, Shizuoka